= Souâd Bahéchar =

- Born: March 24, 1953 (age 73); Casablanca, Morocco
- Occupations: Teacher, museum curator, writer

Souâd Bahéchar is a Moroccan teacher, museum curator, and woman of letters, born in 1953.

== Biography ==
Born on March 24, 1953 in Casablanca, she studied art and archaeology at the University of Paris-Sorbonne. Upon returning to Morocco, she settled in Tangier. She taught art history at the International Higher Institute of Tourism and was appointed curator of the Al Kasbah Museum, which houses archaeological and ethnographic collections. She later directed an art gallery, Tanjah Flandria, from 1990 to 1993, spent time in Germany, and returned to her homeland.

Concurrently, she dedicated herself to writing and eventually left her museum work to focus on literary creation. Her debut novel, Ni fleurs ni couronnes, received the Grand Atlas Prize in 2001. Through this novel, she offers an original perspective on a woman's construction of her identity. The story follows a young girl, the nth daughter of parents longing for a male heir, abandoned during her childhood. She grows up alone on the outskirts of the family home, then in the forest of her village as a wild child, before being taken in by a teacher. However, integrating into the village community proves challenging.

== Selected works ==
- 2000: Ni fleurs ni couronnes, novel, Éditions Le Fennec
- 2005: Le Concert des cloches, novel, Éditions Le Fennec.
- 2011: Casablanca, text accompanying photographs by Marco Bardon, Éditions Filigranes.
